The hard-shell or crispy taco is a Mexican dish that developed in the United States. The earliest references to hard-shell tacos are from the early  
1890s, and by the early 20th century this style of taco was available in Mexican-American communities across the US. Fast food chains began to market hard-shell tacos to Americans in the mid-1950s, with Taco Bell playing a significant role in popularizing the food.

Description 
While there exist many different versions of hard-shell tacos, the most common form of the hard-shell taco is served as a crisp-fried corn tortilla filled with seasoned ground beef, cheese, lettuce, and sometimes tomato, onion, salsa, sour cream, and avocado or guacamole. Such tacos are sold by restaurants and by fast food chains, while kits are readily available in most supermarkets. Hard shell tacos are sometimes known as tacos dorados ("golden tacos") in Spanish, a name that they share with taquitos, a similar dish.

History 

Various sources credit different individuals with the invention of the hard-shell taco, but some form of the dish likely predates all of them. The first known sources mentioning hard-shell tacos are from the early 1890s. Beginning from the early part of the twentieth century, various types of tacos became popular in the United States, especially in Texas and California but also elsewhere. An early appearance of a description of the taco in English was in a 1914 cookbook, California Mexican-Spanish Cookbook by Bertha Haffner Ginger. By the late 1930s, companies like Ashley Mexican Food and Absolute Mexican Foods were selling appliances and ingredients for cooking hard shell tacos, and the first patents for hard-shell taco cooking appliances were filed in the 1940s. Juvencio Maldonado, a restaurant owner from Oaxaca living in New York, is sometimes credited as the original inventor of a hard shell taco-making machine, and received a patent for it in 1950.

The most common type of taco in the US is the hard-shell, U-shaped version, first described in a cookbook, The Good Life: New Mexican food, which was written by Fabiola Cabeza de Baca Gilbert and published in Santa Fe, New Mexico, in 1949.

In the mid-1950s, Glen Bell opened Taco Tia, and began selling a simplified version of the tacos being sold by Mexican restaurants in San Bernardino, particularly the tacos dorados being sold by Lucia and Salvador Rodriguez across the street from another of Bell's restaurants. According to Gustavo Arellano, author of Taco USA: How Mexican Food Conquered America, Bell watched long lines of customers at the Rodriguez's restaurant, called the Mitla Cafe, which attracted a dedicated customer base for its hard-shelled tacos. Bell began eating there regularly, attempting to reverse-engineer the recipe, and eventually won the confidence of the proprietors such that they allowed him to see how the tacos and other foods were prepared. Over the next few years, Bell owned and operated a number of restaurants in southern California including four called El Taco. At this time, Los Angeles was racially segregated, and the tacos sold at Bell's restaurants were many white Americans' first introduction to Mexican food. Bell sold the El Tacos to his partner and built the first Taco Bell in Downey in 1962. Kermit Becky, a former Los Angeles police officer, bought the first Taco Bell franchise from Glen Bell in 1964, and located it in Torrance. The company grew rapidly, and by 1967, the 100th restaurant opened at 400 South Brookhurst in Anaheim. In 1968, its first franchise location east of the Mississippi River opened in Springfield, Ohio.

See also 

American cuisine
Mexican Americans
Taco
Tex-Mex

References 

Mexican-American cuisine
Cuisine of the Southwestern United States
Mexican cuisine
Taco